Grabau  is a surname. Notable people with the surname include:

 Aaron Grabau (born 1978), Australian basketball player
 Amadeus William Grabau (1870–1946), geologist
 Charles Grabau, jurist
 Johannes Andreas August Grabau (1804–1879), theologian
 Lorenzo Grabau (born 1965), financier

See also
 Dorsum Grabau, geological feature on the moon
 Grabau, Lauenburg
 Grabau, Stormarn